Copaganda (a portmanteau of cop and propaganda) is a form of propaganda used to describe depictions of police in a positive (or excessively positive) light while obscuring negative qualities, most often through mass media, with the intent of swaying public opinion for the benefit of law enforcement.

Copaganda has been criticized for being detrimental toward minority groups and victims of police misconduct and brutality, for obscuring criticism of police regardless of validity, and for creating an image of police as infallible heroes incapable of wrongdoing.

History

Brenden Gallagher for The Daily Dot cites "saving kittens" stories and "Christmas gift surprise" stunts as "age-old versions of what we’re seeing today" and continues by stating that "Copaganda is so old, you can find it in Nick at Night reruns. The media has been regurgitating police PR since the days of Andy Griffith, and now in the era of Brooklyn 99, it is just being used more often and more effectively." 

Aaron Rahsaan Thomas comments on the history of copaganda in American television: "The past 60 years have seen shows like Dragnet (1951–59), The Untouchables (1959–63), and Adam 12 (1968–75) establish a formula where, within an hour of story, good law men, also known as square-jawed white cops, defeat bad guys, often known as poor people of color." Subsequent shows such as Hawaii Five-O (1968–80) and Kojak (1973–78) solidified this narrative, along with Hill Street Blues (1981–87), Miami Vice (1984–89), and Cagney & Lacey (1982–89), which were "for the most part, told from the point of view of white cops occasionally interacting with people of color who were, at best, one-dimensional criminals, colleagues, bosses, sidekicks, and best friends. Even when blackness was not equated with criminality, it was often supplemented by an inhuman lack of depth or presence."

Without using the term copaganda, historian E.P. Thompson in the late 1970s drew attention to this phenomenon’s British manifestations. He observed a tendency towards the 'populist celebration of the servants of the state' exemplified on British television by the "homely neighbour and universal uncle, Dixon of Dock Green – the precursor to more truthfully-observed heroes of Z-Cars." He emphasised the impact of World War II and the early Cold War on views of the police held by the public and even the Labour Party: "The bureaucratic statism towards which Labour politicians increasingly drifted carried with it a rhetoric in which the state in all its aspects was seen as a public good… [T]he dividing line between welfare state and police state became obscure."

Purpose

The purpose of copaganda is to sway public opinion for the benefit of law enforcement and redirect attention away from news which may generate a negative image of law enforcement. In an article for The New York Times on a viral video of a Norfolk Police Department lip-sync battle, reporter Laura Holson describes this as one example in a larger trend of "videos of officers performing [which] have gone viral across the country, as departments step up outreach efforts and seek to improve their image" and characterized it as a "public relations dance." Corporal William Pickering, a public information officer with the Norfolk Police Department, which created the 'Uptown Funk' video stated "it is allowing the country to see us in another way."

Brenden Gallagher describes that the purpose of copaganda is to win a public relations battle: "If a disproportionate number of articles about the police engaging in 'random' acts of kindness pop up in your feed, while stories about police corruption or abuse are suppressed or go uncovered completely, the public perception of the police eventually looks far different than the reality." According to an academic study on "Media Power & Information Control: A Study of Police Organizations & Media Relations" for the National Institute of Justice:Most citizens have little contact with law enforcement officers and their opinion of the police is often formed by the mass media's portrayal of our functions. The maintenance of good press relations is therefore a crucial element of public relations. Officers and employees must maintain good rapport with the media and deal with them in a courteous and impartial manner. It must be remembered that the media has a legitimate function in our society and the public trust of the police can be enhanced through proper dealings with the media (#1098-5). The mission ... is (1) to coordinate the release of accurate and timely information to the news media and the public and (2) to promote the positive image of [the Department].

The goals of [the Department] are to maintain public support ... by keeping the avenues of communication among the department, news media and citizenry open. The objectives ... are to utilize the media when attempting to stimulate public interest in departmental programs involving the community [and to] promote a feeling of teamwork between the police and media (#3800). [Officers shall] assume a pro-active approach in contacting the news media with information about the Department that might not otherwise come to their attention, but is newsworthy (#302.3).

	
Ronnie Boyd describes the role of copaganda as an attempt to divert the public's attention from racism and racist policing in America: "stories of Black folx being shot, murdered, sexually assaulted, and harassed by the police have flooded the airwaves since Black folx started building power to draw public attention. Since then, police departments across the country have worked hard to redirect our attention. One of their strategies is 'copaganda.'" Copaganda media has been shown in a study to reinforce racist misconceptions.

Examples

News media are the most common outlets for copaganda, often taking the form of news stories about police officers performing simple tasks that can be construed as laudable by viewers. Amidst the Ferguson unrest in 2014, a widely circulated news story and photographs of 12-year-old Devonte Hart hugging Portland Police Sergeant Bret Barnum, has been identified by critics as a prominent example of copaganda. CBS News picked up the story in an article entitled "Amid Ferguson tension, emotional hug goes viral," with its opening line: "It's being called the hug felt 'round the world." 

In 2018, police lip-sync challenges received popular coverage in news media. USA Today called it "the hit social media trend of the summer" and created a bracket for police departments to submit videos of officers lip syncing to be voted on. The article stated that "nearly each of the lip sync videos that hits social media goes viral making everyone (viewer and video-maker alike) a winner."

During the George Floyd protests, copaganda was identified as a widespread tactic of the police and media. Officers kneeling with protestors in performative displays of solidarity, sometimes moments before teargassing crowds, and the media's focus on looting have been described as copaganda. In the wake of the protests, calls to cancel copaganda television shows entered the mainstream discourse. A&E's Live PD was cancelled and Paramount canceled Cops after 32 seasons.

Major modern TV franchises such as Law & Order, NCIS and FBI and shows such as Scandal, Major Crimes, Chicago PD, Blue Bloods, Hawaii Five-0, Criminal Minds, Magnum P.I., S.W.A.T., and Rookie Blue have been described as portraying "copagandic narratives" to "outright applaud[ing] police" or "mindless glorification." Dick Wolf, the producer of the Law & Order franchise, described himself as "unabashedly pro law enforcement."

The National Law Enforcement Museum was described as "straight-up copaganda" in a review of the institution for The Washington Post, stating that it "leans more toward propaganda than education." Bloomberg Businessweek reported that the museum was unpopular among the public and was projected to "default on some of the $103 million it borrowed in 2016."

News reporting often discusses police shootings in the passive voice, sometimes using the phrase "officer-involved shooting", which has been described as a euphemism or a form of copaganda.  Such language obscures the role the police played in the interaction being described. In the case of "officer-involved shooting", it obscures how the officer was involved in the shooting. This practice is discouraged by NPR and disallowed by the AP Stylebook in 2017.

See also

Officer Friendly
Black Lives Matter
Blue Lives Matter
Thin blue line

References

2010s neologisms
Criticism of journalism
Criticism of television series
Law enforcement
Law enforcement in fiction
Law enforcement in the United States
Portmanteaus
Propaganda